The Harlem Experiment is a 2007 studio album by The Harlem Experiment, a collaborative project including Carlos Alomar, Ruben Rodriguez, Steve Berrios, Eddie Martinez, Don Byron, and Steve Bernstein. It features guest appearances from DJ Arkive, James Hunter, Olu Dara, Taj Mahal, Mums, and Queen Esther.

It is the third entry in a series of albums, the first being The Philadelphia Experiment (2001) and the second being The Detroit Experiment (2003).

Track listing

Personnel
Credits adapted from liner notes.
 Carlos Alomar – guitar
 Ruben Rodriguez – acoustic bass, electric bass
 Steve Berrios – drums, percussion
 Eddie Martinez – electric piano, organ
 Don Byron – clarinet, tenor saxophone
 Steve Bernstein – trumpet
 DJ Arkive – scratches
 James Hunter – vocals, guitar
 Olu Dara – vocals, guitar
 Taj Mahal – vocals
 Mums – vocals
 Queen Esther – vocals

References

External links
 

2007 albums
Ropeadope Records albums